The Japanese dragonet (Neosynchiropus ijimae) is a species of dragonet native to the northwestern Pacific Ocean, where it is known from the waters off of Japan and South Korea. It is also found in the aquarium trade. This species reaches a length of  SL and  TL.

References

Japanese dragonet
Fish of Japan
Fish of Korea
Japanese dragonet
Taxa named by David Starr Jordan